Vision Software was a computer and video game software distributor, headquartered in Johannesburg, South Africa. It was founded in 1990. The company had regional offices in the cities of Durban and Cape Town, and had a high amount of growth in sales to Kenya, and to neighbors of South Africa, Zimbabwe, Namibia, Botswana and Eswatini.

Vision Software was acquired by Electronic Arts (EA) on April 8, 1996. Vision was the leader of software sales in South Africa at the time of its purchase by EA. It was acquired in order to allow direct distribution of software to the South African and neighboring regions.

References

External links
 Official homepage of Electronic Arts

Companies based in Johannesburg
Video game companies established in 1990
Electronic Arts
Software companies of South Africa
1990 establishments in South Africa
Video game companies disestablished in 1996
1996 disestablishments in South Africa
1996 mergers and acquisitions
Defunct video game companies